The Class of '92 is a group of three professional snooker players who all turned professional during the 1992–93 snooker season, who all won the World Snooker Championship on multiple occasions and completed the Triple Crown. The players are Ronnie O'Sullivan, John Higgins and Mark Williams. The three players have a combined 14 World Championships: Williams winning the event on three occasions in 2000, 2003 and 2018; Higgins in 1998, 2007, 2009 and 2011, and O'Sullivan in 2001, 2004, 2008, 2012, 2013, 2020 and 2022.  The three players combined continue to win events thirty years after turning professional, with all three reaching the semi-finals of the 2022 World Snooker Championship alongside Judd Trump, also doing so in 1998 alongside Ken Doherty and in 1999 alongside Stephen Hendry.

References

+
Nicknamed groups of sportspeople
Ronnie O'Sullivan